Olu Dara Jones (born Charles Jones III, January 12, 1941) is an American cornetist, guitarist, and singer. He is the father of rapper Nas.

Early life
Olu Dara was born Charles Jones III on January 12, 1941, in Natchez, Mississippi. His mother, Ella Mae Jones, was born in Canton, Mississippi. His father, Charlie R Jones was born in Natchez, was a traveling musician, and sang with The Melodiers, a vocal quartet with a guitarist.

As a child, Dara took piano and clarinet lessons. He studied at Tennessee State University, initially a pre-med major, switching to music theory and composition.

Career
From 1959 to 1964 he was a musician in the Navy, which he described as a priceless educational experience.

In 1964, he moved to New York City and changed his name to Olu Dara, which means "The Lord is good" in the Yoruba language. In the 1970s and '80s he played alongside David Murray, Henry Threadgill, Hamiet Bluiett, Don Pullen, Charles Brackeen, James Blood Ulmer, and Cassandra Wilson. He formed two bands, the Okra Orchestra and the Natchezsippi Dance Band.

His first album, In the World: From Natchez to New York (1998), revealed another aspect of his musical personality: the leader and singer of a band immersed in African-American tradition, playing an eclectic mix of blues, jazz, and storytelling, with tinges of funk, African popular music, and reggae. His second album Neighborhoods, with guest appearances by Dr. John and Cassandra Wilson, followed in a similar vein.

Dara played on the album Illmatic (1994) by his son, rapper Nas, and on the song "Dance" (2002), also by Nas, and he sang on Nas's song "Bridging the Gap" (2004).

Discography

As leader
 In the World: From Natchez to New York (Atlantic, 1998)
 Neighborhoods (Atlantic, 2001)

With Material
 Memory Serves (1981)
 The Third Power (1991)

As sideman
With Charles Brackeen
 1987 Attainment (Silkheart)
 1987 Worshippers Come Nigh (Silkheart)

With Rhys Chatham
 1984 Factor X
 1987 Die Donnergötter (The Thundergods)

With Carlos Garnett
 1975 Let This Melody Ring On (Muse) 
 1977 Fire

With Corey Harris
 2002 Downhome Sophisticate
 2005 Daily Bread

With Craig Harris
 1985 Tributes (OTC)
 1999 Cold Sweat Plays J. B. (JMT)

With David Murray
 Flowers for Albert: The Complete Concert (India Navigation, 1976)
 Ming (Black Saint, 1980)
 Home (Black Saint, 1981)
 Live at Sweet Basil Volume 1 (Black Saint, 1984)
 Live at Sweet Basil Volume 2 (Black Saint, 1984)
 The Tip (DIW, 1995)
 Jug-A-Lug (DIW, 1995)

With Nas
 1994 Illmatic 
 2002 God's Son
 2004 Bridging the Gap
 2004 Street's Disciple

With Jamaaladeen Tacuma
 1983 Show Stopper 
 1984 Renaissance Man

With Henry Threadgill
 1982 When Was That?
 1983 Just the Facts and Pass the Bucket

With James Blood Ulmer
 Are You Glad to Be in America? (1980)
 Free Lancing (1981)
 No Escape from the Blues: The Electric Lady Sessions (2003)

With Cassandra Wilson
 1987 Days Aweigh (JMT)
 1993 Blue Light 'Til Dawn 
 1999 Traveling Miles 
 2002 Belly of the Sun

With others
 1970 Journey to Air, Terumasa Hino
 1970 Who Knows What Tomorrow's Gonna Bring?, Jack McDuff
 1973 Ethnic Expressions, Roy Brooks
 1973 Revelation, Doug Carn
 1975 Heavy Spirits, Oliver Lake
 1977 Endangered Species, Hamiet Bluiett
 1978 Live at Moers Festival, Phillip Wilson
 1980 Flat-Out Jump Suite, Julius Hemphill
 1982 Flying Out, Cecil McBee
 1982 Nots, Elliott Sharp
 1983 Nona, Nona Hendryx
 1985 The African Flower, James Newton
 1985 The Sixth Sense, Don Pullen
 1993 Deconstruction: Celluloid Recordings, Bill Laswell
 1997 KC After Dark, Kansas City Band
 1998 Empire Box, Tim Berne
 1998 You Don't Know My Mind, Guy Davis
 2002 Medicated Magic, Dirty Dozen Brass Band
 2002 Trance Atlantic (Boom Bop II), Jean-Paul Bourelly
 2003 Chinatown, The Be Good Tanyas
 2007 The Harlem Experiment, The Harlem Experiment
 2007 This Is Where You Wanna Be, The Brawner Brothers

References

External links

American jazz cornetists
American jazz singers
American jazz trumpeters
American male trumpeters
African-American guitarists
1941 births
Living people
Musicians from Natchez, Mississippi
Atlantic Records artists
Nas
Guitarists from Mississippi
20th-century American guitarists
Jazz musicians from Mississippi
American male guitarists
American male jazz musicians